San Juan Bautista is a town on Isla Margarita, in the state of Nueva Esparta, Venezuela. It is the capital of the Antonio Díaz Municipality. 

Populated places in Nueva Esparta
Margarita Island